Zanthoxylum mayu, synonym Fagara mayu, is a species of plant in the family Rutaceae. It is endemic to Chile.  It is threatened by habitat loss.

References

 

mayu
Endemic flora of Chile
Vulnerable plants
Taxonomy articles created by Polbot
Taxobox binomials not recognized by IUCN